Beni Amrane is a town and commune in Boumerdès Province, Algeria. According to the 1998 census it has a population of 21,452.

Villages
The villages of the commune of Beni Amrane are:

History

French conquest

 Expedition of the Col des Beni Aïcha (1837)
 First Battle of the Issers (1837)
 Battle of the Col des Beni Aïcha (1871)

Algerian Revolution

 Ferme Gauthier

Salafist terrorism

 2008 Beni Amrane bombings (9 June 2008)

Rivers

This commune is crossed by several rivers:
 Boumerdès River
 Corso River
 Isser River
 Meraldene River

Football clubs

Notable people

Boualem Boukacem (born 1957), Algerian artist.
Maamar Bettayeb (born 1953), Algerian academician.
Mohamed Hassaïne (1945-1994), Algerian journalist.

References

Communes of Boumerdès Province